The Snoqualmie River is a  long river in King County and Snohomish County in the U.S. state of Washington. The river's three main tributaries are the North, Middle, and South Forks, which drain the west side of the Cascade Mountains near the town of North Bend and join near the town of Snoqualmie just above the Snoqualmie Falls. After the falls the river flows north through rich farmland and the towns of Fall City, Carnation, and Duvall before meeting the Skykomish River to form the Snohomish River near Monroe. The Snohomish River empties into Puget Sound at Everett. Other tributaries of the Snoqualmie River include the Taylor River and the Pratt River, both of which enter the Middle Fork, the Tolt River, which joins at Carnation, and the Raging River at Fall City.

Many of the Snoqualmie River's headwaters originate as snowmelt within the Alpine Lakes Wilderness.  On August 8, 2007, U.S. Representative Dave Reichert (WA-08), King County Executive Ron Sims, and others announced a proposal to expand the Alpine Lakes Wilderness to include the valley of the Pratt River, a tributary of the Middle Fork, near the town of North Bend.  The proposal would also give the Pratt River National Wild and Scenic River status.

South Fork 

It then flows west for a bit before turning northwest and continuing in that general direction until it merges with the Snoqualmie River Proper just above Snoqualmie Falls. It drops over a total of 6 waterfalls (many would argue 8 because many people divide the final one into three portions).

Middle Fork 

It receives the waters of the Taylor River and the Pratt River in short order about halfway between its source and its mouth. It has one major waterfall along its course. The upper reaches of the Middle Fork, Taylor, and Pratt river valleys are within the boundaries of the Alpine Lakes Wilderness area.

The Middle Fork Valley is a popular recreational area since it is accessible during the winter due to its low altitude and close proximity to Seattle.  For many years the Middle Fork Road extended 24 miles to Hardscrabble Creek, but was gated at Dingford Creek in June 2007, 18 miles in. The gate at Dingford Creek was a controversial part of the Access and Travel Management plan adopted by the US Forest Service in 2005. Much of the road's route is on the 1920s and 30's era railroad grade of the North Bend Timber Company. The paved portion of the Middle Fork road was extended by 9.7 miles during a 3-year construction project from 2014-2016, extending pavement to just before the Taylor River bridge. The Middle Fork Valley was heavily logged starting in 1923 and continued up through the 1970s.  The obvious railroad grades, pilings, and related debris are from the North Bend Timber Company's activity from 1923 to 1941.

North Fork 
Almost directly after exiting the lake it drops over Kanim Falls. The river then flows east before making a wide turn north. Just before its confluence with the Middle Fork the river flows through a canyon near Ernie's Grove. There are several waterfalls within this canyon including Fantastic Falls.

Waterfalls 

The Snoqualmie River has quite a few major waterfalls. However, the three forks of the upper Snoqualmie River also have notable waterfalls. The north fork has Fantastic Falls (35 ft) and Kanim Falls (200 ft). The middle fork has Nellie Falls (150 ft). And, the south fork has Twin Falls (135 ft), Middle Twin Falls, Upper Twin Falls, Weeks Falls, Upper Weeks Falls, Denny Camp Falls, Franklin Falls (135 ft), and Fall-into-the-Wall Falls (22 ft).

Snoqualmie Falls was featured on the television series Twin Peaks. Shots of upriver Snoqualmie also feature in some of the show's title sequences.

Whitewater kayaking, canoeing and rafting 
The Snoqualmie River has quite a few sections suitable for whitewater kayaking and rafting.  It features run rate Class II to Class V+.  The nearby Raging River also features a kayaking run.

Flooding 

The Snoqualmie River is prone to flooding and typically sees multiple flood events annually that inundate local farmland and close low-lying roads. During record level floods, all road access to the towns of Carnation and Duvall becomes closed off. The last four times this happened were during the floods of 2020, 2009, 2006, and 1990.

The river level of the Snoqualmie River is monitored by six USGS streamgages, one on each fork, one just above the falls, one below Carnation, and one near Duvall. Data from the streamgages are used by the National Weather Service for flood forecasting and warning. The Tolt River and the Raging River are also monitored by USGS streamgages.

The Snoqualmie Flood Reduction Project was a controversial Army Corps of Engineers project completed in 2005 to reduce the effect of floods in the town of Snoqualmie by widening the river just above the falls.

See also 
 List of Washington rivers

Cities on the river
 North Bend, Washington
 Snoqualmie, Washington
 Fall City, Washington
 Carnation, Washington
 Duvall, Washington

References

External links 

 Snoqualmie River Status from Floodzilla
 NOAA - Snoqualmie Stations
 King County/USGS - Snoqualmie River Flooding Information
 Snoqualmie Flood Reduction Project (a.k.a. Snoqualmie 205 Project)
 Historical information on the Middle Fork Valley

Rivers of King County, Washington
Rivers of Washington (state)
Rivers of Snohomish County, Washington
Wild and Scenic Rivers of the United States